4 Idiots (stylized as 4 idiots) is a 2018 Indian Odia language comedy film  directed by Basanta Sahoo and starring Sabyasachi Mishra, Akash Dasnayak, Kuna Tripathy, Chittaranjan Tripathy, Elina Samantray, Lipsa Mishra and Poonam Mishra. The music is composed by Prem Anand.

Plot
"Four friends" referred as "4 Idiots" in the movie. They are living a Happy-go-Lucky life but one day they dragged accidentally into trouble. 3 of the idiots are married and only one (Sabysachi Mishra) is not married but is engaged and in love with a lady (Elina Samantray).

Cast
 Sabyasachi Mishra 
 Akash Dasnayak
 Kuna Tripathy
 Chittaranjan Tripathy
 Elina Samantray
 Lipsa Mishra
 Poonam Mishra

Production
The launch event for the film was held at a hotel in Bhubaneswar with the star cast of the film. The star cast includes Kuna Tripathy, Akash Dasnayak, Papu Pom Pom and Sabyasachi Mishra, Chandini, Poonam Mishra, Lipsa Mishra and Elina Samantray. The principal photography of the film was started on 20 April 2018. This event was attended by Odia film and serial fraternity.

Soundtrack
All songs are composed by Prem Anand and the song "Mad Romeo" is composed by G. Durga Prasad, Nabs & Saroj. An event was held for the music release of the film at Forum Mart, Bhubaneswar on 25 May 2018. The cast and crew of the film were also present at the event.

Release
This film was released on 14 June 2018 on the day of Raja Festival.

References

External links
 

2010s Odia-language films
2018 films
Indian comedy films
2018 comedy films